Holy Cross of San Antonio is a Catholic, coeducational college preparatory secondary school located in the Loma Vista neighborhood of San Antonio, Texas, on the west side of the city, in the Roman Catholic Archdiocese of San Antonio.

History
Holy Cross was opened in 1957 by the Archdiocese of San Antonio. At the suggestion of the Brothers of Holy Cross it was established as a four-year college preparatory school for boys. The first class of 84 boys enrolled as freshmen on September 3, 1957, with a faculty of three Brothers and a chaplain. It was jointly funded by a tuition fee and a subsidy from the Archdiocese. In 1968 the school faced possible closure because of the threatened withdrawal of the Archdiocese subsidy, but the financial issues were resolved, in part by adding grades 7 and 8 so that it became a middle and secondary school. Due to a lack of medical services in the area, in 1981 parents and alumni supported the establishment of Holy Cross Family Medical Center, which was expanded in 1985 and moved to a site across the street from the school, where it remains in operation.

In 1994 the school was incorporated as an independent Catholic school with a board of governors. In 2001 ownership was transferred to Holy Cross Community Services, a non-profit which also owned the medical center. Fundraising remained an issue to keep tuition as low as possible.

In 2002 the last Catholic high school for girls in the area closed. During the following decade the school gradually transitioned to a coeducational student body, becoming fully coed in 2009. The school's trustee, Brother Stanley Culotta, has been managing the school for almost 60 years as of 2017.

Athletics
Their principal rivals are Central Catholic Marianist High School, Providence High School, San Antonio Christian Schools and Regents School of Austin.

The Holy Bowl
The Holy Bowl is a traditional rivalry game played between Holy Cross and Central Catholic Marianist High School. The first game was played in November 1963 at the old Missions Stadium on a Sunday. Holy Cross lost that first meeting. The Holy Bowl has been held in almost every stadium in the city. Including the Alamodome (2002-2004). Holy Cross won The Holy Bowl in 1967, 1984, 1988, 1992, 1998, 2004, 2005, 2006, 2011, 2012, 2013, 2018 and 2019. There was a hiatus in the series from 1993 to 1997.

In 2012, the game marked the first time in the history of the series that Holy Cross and Central Catholic have met in their season opener. The schedule changed when Holy Cross moved from TAPPS 2-I to TAPPS 3-II in the realignment by the Texas Association of Private and Parochial Schools.

In 2014 The Holy Bowl went on hiatus due to scheduling conflicts. The Holy Bowl will return in Week 2 of the 2018 football season.

Mascot
Holy Cross "Knights", named for the English term for a social position. The Fighting Irish ("The Irish") is the mascot of The University of Notre Dame in South Bend, Indiana also a Congregation of Holy Cross Institution.

Religious life
Christian service is an integral part of a Holy Cross education. Because of the importance of Christian service, Holy Cross students are required to serve the community through charitable acts as a requirement for graduation.

Traditions 
 The Holy Cross annual alumni softball tournament happens each year on Memorial Day weekend. The double-elimination two-day tournament sets teams by individual graduating classes, with an older division and a younger division.
In addition to the softball tournament, The alumni basketball tournament is held every year at the end of June in honor of Daniel Gutierrez a graduate of Holy Cross who lost his long battle with Cancer in 2006. Proceeds from this event go to a Scholarship in his name.
Holy Cross is a historically All-Boys institution therefore The Alumni softball tournament, The alumni basketball tournament and the alumni soccer tournament are largely competed in by male graduates.
The night before "The Holy Bowl", Holy Cross holds the tailgate party and pep-rally to build community and support for the school, program, team and alumni, which establishes a strong core of support for the game.

Notable alumni 

Emilio M. Garza, judge of the United States Court of Appeals for the Fifth Circuit
Stan Kelly, public address announcer for the San Antonio Spurs of the National Basketball Association
Bubba Hernandez, former member of the polka band Brave Combo and Grammy Award winner
 Roger Metzger, shortstop for the Chicago Cubs (1970), Houston Astros (1971–78) and San Francisco Giants (1978–80)
Robert Santos, statistician

References

External links

 School Website

Catholic secondary schools in Texas
Holy Cross secondary schools
Educational institutions established in 1957
High schools in San Antonio
Private middle schools in Texas
Boys' schools in Texas
1957 establishments in Texas